Meg Elizabeth Donnelly (born July 25, 2000) is an American actress. She portrayed Taylor Otto in the ABC sitcom American Housewife, and Addison in the 2018 Disney Channel Original Movie Zombies and its sequels, Zombies 2 (2020) and Zombies 3 (2022). Since 2022, she has starred as Mary Campbell in the CW television series The Winchesters, which serves as a sequel to Supernatural.

Early life
Donnelly was born in New York City and grew up in Peapack-Gladstone, New Jersey. She is an only child. She began training in voice, dance and acting at the Annie’s Playhouse School of Performing Arts in Far Hills, New Jersey at the age of six.  She has appeared as a featured vocalist in several Kids of the Arts, Broadway Kids and Time To Shine productions in New York City.

Career
Donnelly co-starred as Ash in the 2013 Netflix series Team Toon. She was the American face of Clean and Clear's 2015 Awkward to Awesome campaign, and was the understudy for the role of Louisa von Trapp in the NBC television special The Sound of Music Live!. Donnelly also appeared in the feature film The Broken Ones that premiered at the 2017 SOHO International Film Festival.

Donnelly played the starring role of Taylor Otto in the ABC sitcom American Housewife from 2016 to 2021. On August 5, 2018, Donnelly released her first single, "Smile". On March 1, 2019, Donnelly released her second single, "Digital Love".

She stars as Addison in the Disney Channel Original Movie musical Zombies that premiered on February 16, 2018. In February 2019, it was announced that Donnelly would be reprising her role as Addison for a Zombies sequel, Zombies 2, which premiered on Disney Channel on February 14, 2020. A third entry in the series, Zombies 3, was released in July and August 2022 on Disney+ and Disney Channel, respectively.

In March 2022, Donnelly was cast in the co-lead role of Mary Campbell in the Supernatural spinoff, The Winchesters, which was picked up to series by The CW in May 2022.

Filmography

References

External links
 
 

Actresses from New Jersey
American television actresses
American female models
American female dancers
Living people
People from Peapack-Gladstone, New Jersey
21st-century American musicians
21st-century American actresses
2000 births
21st-century American women musicians